The Actress is a 1953 American comedy-drama film based on Ruth Gordon's autobiographical play Years Ago. Gordon herself wrote the screenplay. The film was directed by George Cukor and stars Jean Simmons, Spencer Tracy, and Teresa Wright, and features Anthony Perkins in his film debut.

The film is basically a series of vignettes involving Ruth, her parents, her best friends, and the college boy romantically pursuing her. Although Gordon did in fact become an accomplished Academy Award-winning actress and a successful writer, the film ends without the audience seeing Gordon achieve her goals.

The Actress was nominated for an Oscar for Best Costume Design, Black-and-White. Tracy won the Golden Globe Award for Best Motion Picture Actor in a Drama and was nominated for a BAFTA for Best Foreign Actor. Simmons was named Best Actress by the National Board of Review, and Gordon's screenplay was nominated Best Written American Comedy by the Writers Guild of America, despite being far more dramatic than comedic.

Plot
In 1913, Wollaston, Massachusetts, teenage student Ruth Gordon Jones dreams of a theatrical career after becoming mesmerized by a performance of The Pink Lady in a Boston theater. Encouraged to pursue her dream by real-life leading lady Hazel Dawn in response to a fan letter she sent her, Ruth schemes to drop out of school and move to New York City, unbeknownst to her father, Clinton Jones, a former seaman now working at a menial factory job, who wants her to continue her education and become a physical education instructor instead. As a young man, Clinton's bad family situation forced him to drop out of school and run away to sea, so he is dismayed that his daughter rejects the educational opportunities he would have liked for himself. In addition to overcoming her father's objections, Ruth must also deal with her feelings for Fred Whitmarsh, a handsome Harvard University student who falls in love with her and eventually proposes marriage.

When Ruth gets the chance to audition for a leading producer, she disobeys her father and puts off Fred's serious romantic overtures to keep the appointment. However, her audition proves disastrous and crushes her confidence and enthusiasm. She confesses to her father what she has done, and after getting over his initial anger, he offers to support her during her first few months in New York if she will at least get her high school diploma. Despite his promise, Clinton is not sure where he will get the support money for Ruth, and is anxious about his job security. He counts on his annual bonus to provide the necessary funds, but his employer is slow in paying it.

Her enthusiasm restored, Ruth makes the arrangements to go to New York after graduation. On the day she is scheduled to depart, Clinton suddenly loses his job after confronting his boss about his bonus, leaving him with no money to give to Ruth. When Clinton sees that Ruth is determined to go to New York even without his monetary support, he gives her his most prized possession, his treasured spyglass from his seafaring days, to sell in New York, where his old acquaintance will buy it from her for an even larger sum than the amount Clinton originally promised Ruth. The family heads happily to the railroad station to see Ruth off.

Cast
 Spencer Tracy as Clinton Jones
 Jean Simmons as Ruth Gordon Jones
 Teresa Wright as Annie Jones
 Anthony Perkins as Fred Whitmarsh (film debut)
 Ian Wolfe as Mr. Bagley
 Kay Williams as Hazel Dawn
 Mary Wickes as Emma Glavey
 Norma Jean Nilsson as Anna Williams
 Dawn Bender as Katherine Follets
 Jackie Coogan as Inopportune (uncredited)

Production
Director George Cukor wanted Debbie Reynolds for the lead; she was greatly disappointed when MGM executive Dore Schary decided not to cast her in the role.

Reception
According to MGM records, the film made $594,000 in the US and Canada and $320,000 elsewhere, resulting in a loss to the studio of $965,000.

It recorded admissions in France of 15,493.

References

External links
 
 
 
 
 , play on which film is based

1953 films
1953 comedy-drama films
American comedy-drama films
Biographical films about actors
American black-and-white films
Films about actors
Films about theatre
American films based on plays
Films directed by George Cukor
Films featuring a Best Drama Actor Golden Globe winning performance
Films set in 1913
Films set in Massachusetts
Metro-Goldwyn-Mayer films
1950s English-language films
1950s American films